The 2003 ARCA Re/Max Series was the 51st season of the ARCA Racing Series, a division of the Automobile Racing Club of America (ARCA). The season began on February 8, 2003, with the Advance Discount Auto Parts 200 at Daytona International Speedway. The season ended with the Bank of America 200 Presented by Fox 21/27 at South Boston Speedway on October 18. Frank Kimmel won the drivers championship, his fifth in the series and fourth in a row, and Bill Eversole won the Rookie of the Year award.

Schedule & Winners

Drivers' championship
(key) Bold – Pole position awarded by time. Italics – Pole position set by final practice results or rainout. * – Most laps led. ** – All laps led.
{|
| valign="top" |

External links
Official ARCA Website

References

ARCA Menards Series seasons
Arca Remax Series